Ehrendorferia ochroleuca (formerly Dicentra ochroleuca), commonly known as white eardrops or yellow bleeding-heart, is a biennial or perennial, native to gravelly areas in the chaparral and woodlands of California (Peninsular, Transverse, and southern Coast Ranges) and in Baja California.

Description
Stems and leaves are glaucous. Leaves are pinnately divided 2–4 times. They grow in a basal rosette the first year and later also on flowering stems.

Flowers are up-facing, in round clusters at the end of the stems. They have 2 round sepals and 4 dull white petals with purple tips. The 2 outer petals are pouched at the base and curved outwards at the tip. The 2 inner petals are connected at the tip and project out from between the outer petals. The flowers have no odor, unlike the closely related species Ehrendorferia chrysantha. Hummingbirds visit the flowers for nectar.

They lack the elaiosomes present in many other members of the family. They do not easily germinate without being exposed to smoke. In cultivation, a liquid smoke extract is often used.

References

 Bleeding hearts, Corydalis, and their relatives. Mark Tebbitt, Magnus Lidén, and Henrik Zetterlund. Timber Press. 2008. — Google Books

External links

Jepson Manual Treatment – (as Dicentra ochroleuca)

Fumarioideae
Flora of California
Flora of Baja California
Natural history of the California chaparral and woodlands
Natural history of the California Coast Ranges
Natural history of the Channel Islands of California
Natural history of the Peninsular Ranges
Natural history of the San Francisco Bay Area
Natural history of the Santa Monica Mountains
Natural history of the Transverse Ranges
Flora without expected TNC conservation status